Zbigniew Schodowski (born 30 April 1987) is a Polish rower. He competed in the Men's eight event at the 2012 Summer Olympics.

References

External links
 

1987 births
Living people
Polish male rowers
Olympic rowers of Poland
Rowers at the 2012 Summer Olympics
Rowers at the 2016 Summer Olympics
Sportspeople from Toruń
World Rowing Championships medalists for Poland
European Rowing Championships medalists